The Prince Charles Cinema (PCC) is a repertory cinema located in Leicester Place, 50 yards north of Leicester Square in the West End of London. It shows a rotating programme of cult, arthouse, and classic films alongside recent Hollywood releases – typically more than ten different films a week on two screens (300 velvet seats downstairs and 104 high back leather seats upstairs). It also hosts a sing-a-long version of The Sound of Music, as well as The Rocky Horror Picture Show and The Room. The cinema has achieved a cult status amongst fans, and is the only independent cinema in the West End.

History 
Constructed between 1961 and 1962, the building was built by  Richard Costain Limited for Alfred Esdaile and designed by Carl Fisher and Associates. The building originally functioned as a theatre with a distinctive 'satellite dish' curve to the floor of the stalls, meaning that audience members are sat at an upwards angle as they face the stage. After a short period supporting the dramatic arts, the venue was reinvented as a porn cinema. During this period it hosted the UK's longest continuous run of Emmanuelle, as well as Caligula (1979).

The cinema was used as the setting for a number of stunts in the British sketch show Trigger Happy TV in the early 2000s. Filming was facilitated by the cinema having a balcony at the time from which aerial shots could be taken, which was later converted into a second screen in 2008.

During the UK launch of Kill Bill: Volume 2 (2004), Uma Thurman recorded a special video introduction for a double bill of both movies being held at the cinema.  In it she welcomed the audience to "Quentin's favourite UK cinema". Quentin Tarantino has said, "The Prince Charles Cinema is everything an independent movie theatre should be. For lovers of quality films, this is Mecca." and "The day Kill Bill plays the Prince Charles is the day Kill Bill truly comes home." He further described it as London's "queen's jewel" of a grindhouse saying "I was so honoured when Reservoir Dogs hit so big there that they started playing it at midnight and all the lads would show up in the black suits with little squirt guns".

In April 2007, the cinema opened an official Kevin Smith toilet cubicle, after the director held a question and answer session at the cinema. He said "I don't know, Quentin Tarantino has never turned up here and they name the bar after him, it's my second visit and they haven't even named a toilet after me!" The next day they screwed a framed picture of him to the first cubicle in the gents and he officially opened the toilet. The Kevin Smith cubicle is now in the ladies toilets as the cinema swapped the ladies and gents in late 2013. 

As a commitment to promoting environmental causes, the PCC screened the documentary An Inconvenient Truth every week of 2007. Often the screenings have Q&As with special guests; previous speakers have included Tony Juniper, David Miliband and Sir Menzies Campbell.

The cinema and surrounding area was featured in the music video to "Golden Gaze" by Ian Brown. Peter Doherty, lead singer of The Libertines, worked at the cinema for several months in 1999 before being dismissed.

Canopy 
The canopy above the cinema is used for regular advertising for films, and also often sports cult film quotes or other obscure messages.  Previous messages have cheered on England in the World Cup, proclaimed the cinema to be the ninth wonder of the world, after King Kong, and joked about other cinemas in the area.

References

External links 
 Official website
 Sing-a-long-a Sound of Music website

Cinemas in London
Buildings and structures in the City of Westminster
Tourist attractions in the City of Westminster
Repertory cinemas